Patrick Henry Nelson (July 26, 1824 – June 24, 1864) was a Confederate States Army officer and militia general from South Carolina during the American Civil War.

Biography

Patrick Henry Nelson was born in Clarendon County, South Carolina to Samuel Edgar Nelson and Amarintha Carson McCaulay. He graduated from the South Carolina College as a member of the class of 1844. Later he married Emma Sarah Cantey (daughter of General James Willis Cantey, cousin to General James Cantey, and great granddaughter of General Richard Richardson (general)), and had three children (including Patrick Henry Nelson II).

Nelson was a Major General in the South Carolina Militia and a Brigadier General in command of the 2nd Brigade of South Carolina Volunteers during the engagement with Union troops during the Battle of Fort Sumter.

With the reorganization and enlargement of the Confederate Army, Nelson was made Lt. Colonel of the 7th South Carolina Infantry Battalion in 1862. In 1864, Nelson was assigned to Brigadier General Johnson Hagood's Brigade when the battalion was ordered to Virginia in the spring. On June 24th, 1864, in the Battle of Petersburg, Nelson led an attack of 400 men on the extreme right of the Union lines near the Appomattox River. When other Confederate units did not support Colonel Nelson's force, they suffered heavy casualties. Colonel Nelson was never seen again. Last reports of Nelson were that he was seen leading his men into the Union rifle pits.

Upon hearing the news of the death of Nelson, his commanding officer Brigadier General Hagood lamented "Thus fell a devoted patriot, a gallant soldier, a courteous gentleman."

Nelson's son, Patrick Henry Nelson II, founded the Nelson Law Firm, was a member of the South Carolina House of Representatives, and was the Fifth Circuit Solicitor and the President of the South Carolina Bar Association (1911-1912).

General Nelson is buried in the Quaker Cemetery in Camden, South Carolina.

References

External links

1824 births
1864 deaths
People from Camden, South Carolina
People from Clarendon County, South Carolina
University of South Carolina alumni
People of South Carolina in the American Civil War
Confederate States Army officers
Confederate militia generals
Confederate States of America military personnel killed in the American Civil War